The Villa Medici is a Mannerist villa and an architectural complex with a garden contiguous with the larger Borghese gardens, on the Pincian Hill next to Trinità dei Monti in Rome, Italy. The Villa Medici, founded by Ferdinando I de' Medici, Grand Duke of Tuscany and now property of the French State, has housed the French Academy in Rome since 1803. A musical evocation of its garden fountains features in Ottorino Respighi's Fountains of Rome.

History 
In ancient times, the site of the Villa Medici was part of the gardens of Lucullus, which passed into the hands of the Imperial family with Messalina, who was murdered in the villa.

In 1564, when the nephews of Cardinal Giovanni Ricci of Montepulciano acquired the property, it had long been abandoned to viticulture. The sole dwelling was the Casina of Cardinale Marcello Crescenzi, who had maintained a vineyard here and had begun improvements to the villa under the direction of the Florentine Nanni Lippi, who had died however, before work had proceeded far. The new proprietors commissioned Annibale Lippi, the late architect's son, to continue work. Interventions by Michelangelo are a tradition.

In 1576, the property was acquired by Cardinal Ferdinando de' Medici, who finished the structure to designs by Bartolomeo Ammanati. The Villa Medici became at once the first among Medici properties in Rome, intended to give concrete expression to the ascendancy of the Medici among Italian princes and assert their permanent presence in Rome. Under the Cardinal's insistence, Ammanati incorporated into the design Roman bas-reliefs and statues that were coming to sight with almost every spadeful of earth, with the result that the facades of the Villa Medici, as it now was, became a virtual open-air museum. A series of grand gardens recalled the botanical gardens created at Pisa and at Florence by the Cardinal's father Cosimo I de' Medici, sheltered in plantations of pines, cypresses and oaks. Ferdinando de' Medici had a studiolo, a retreat for study and contemplation, built to the north east of the garden above the Aurelian wall. Now these rooms look onto Borghese gardens but would then have had views over the Roman countryside. These two rooms were only uncovered in 1985 by the restorer Geraldine Albers: the concealing whitewash had protected and conserved the superb fresco decoration carried out by Jacopo Zucchi 1576 and 1577.

Among the striking assemblage of Roman sculptures in the villa were some one hundred seventy pieces bought from two Roman collections that had come together through marriage, the Capranica and the della Valle collections. An engraving detailing the arrangement of statues prior to 1562 was documented by Galassi Alghisi. Three works that arrived at the Villa Medici under Cardinal Fernando, ranked with the most famous in the city: the Niobe Group and the Wrestlers, both discovered in 1583 and immediately purchased by Cardinal Ferdinando, and the Arrotino. When the Cardinal succeeded as Grand Duke of Tuscany in 1587, his elder brother having died, he satisfied himself with plaster copies of his Niobe Group, in full knowledge of the prestige that accrued to the Medici by keeping such a magnificent collection in the European city whose significance far surpassed that of their own capital. The Medici lions were completed in 1598, and the Medici Vase entered the collection at the Villa, followed by the Venus de' Medici by the 1630s; the Medici sculptures were not removed to Florence until the eighteenth century. Then the antiquities from the Villa Medici formed the nucleus of the collection of antiquities in the Uffizi, and Florence began to figure on the European Grand Tour.

The fountain in the front of the Villa Medici is formed from a red granite vase from ancient Rome. It was designed by Annibale Lippi in 1589. The view from the Villa looking over the fountain towards St Peter's in the distance has been much painted, but the trees in the foreground have now obscured the view.

Like the Villa Borghese that adjoins them, the villa's gardens were far more accessible than the formal palaces such as Palazzo Farnese in the heart of the city. For a century and a half the Villa Medici was one of the most elegant and worldly settings in Rome, the seat of the Grand Dukes' embassy to the Holy See. When the male line of the Medici died out in 1737, the villa passed to the house of Lorraine and, briefly in Napoleonic times, to the Kingdom of Etruria. In this manner Napoleon Bonaparte came into possession of the Villa Medici, which he transferred to the French Academy at Rome. Subsequently, it housed the winners of the prestigious Prix de Rome, under distinguished directors including Ingres and Balthus, until the prize was withdrawn in 1968.

In 1656, Christina, Queen of Sweden was said to have fired one of the cannon on top of the Castel Sant'Angelo without aiming it first. The wayward ball hit the villa, destroying one of the Florentine lilies that decorated the facade.

French Academy in Rome 

In 1803, Napoleon Bonaparte moved the French Academy in Rome to the Villa Medici with the intention of preserving an institution once threatened by the French Revolution. At first, the villa and its gardens were in a sad state, and they had to be renovated in order to house the winners of the Prix de Rome. In this way, he hoped to retain for young French artists the opportunity to see and copy the masterpieces of antiquity and the Renaissance.
The young architect Auguste-Henri-Victor Grandjean de Montigny undertook the renovation.

The competition was interrupted during the first World War, and Benito Mussolini confiscated the villa in 1941, forcing the Academy of France in Rome to withdraw until 1945. The competition and the Prix de Rome were abolished in 1968 by André Malraux, the French Minister of Culture. The Académie des Beaux-Arts in Paris and the Institut de France then lost their guardianship of the Villa Medici to the Ministry of Culture and the French State.

From that time on, the boarders no longer belonged solely to the traditional disciplines (painting, sculpture, architecture, metal-engraving, precious-stone engraving, musical composition, etc.) but also to new or previously neglected artistic fields (art history, archaeology, literature, stagecraft, photography, movies, video, art restoration, writing and even cookery.) Artists are no longer recruited by a competition but by application, and their stays generally vary from six to eighteen months.

Between 1961 and 1967, the artist Balthus, then at the head of the Academy, carried out a vast restoration campaign of the palace and its gardens, providing them with modern equipment. Balthus participated “hands on” in all the phases of the construction. Where the historic décor had disappeared, Balthus proposed personal alternatives. He invented a décor that was a homage to the past and, at the same time, radically contemporary: The mysterious melancholic decor he created for Villa Medici has become, in turn, historic and was undergoing an important restoration campaign in 2016. Work continued under the direction of the previous director, Richard Peduzzi, and the Villa Medici resumed organizing exhibitions and shows created by its artists in residence.

The Academy continues its programme of inviting young artists, who receive a stipend to spend twelve months in Rome, exhibiting their work. These artists-in-residence are known as pensionnaires. The French word ‘pension’ refers to the room & board these, generally young and promising, artists receive. The Villa Medici hosts a number of guest rooms, and when these are not used by pensionnaires or other official guests, they are open to the general public.

Architectural influence 

Several structures base their style on the villa. Architect Edward Lippincott Tilton designed the Hotel Colorado in Glenwood Springs, Colorado, in 1893. Philanthropist James H. Dooley had a mansion called Swannanoa built on Rockfish Gap, Virginia, in 1912. The NYC architectural firm, Schultze and Weaver, modeled the Breakers Hotel in Palm Beach, Florida after the Villa for the hotel's second reconstruction, which took place between 1925 and 1926.

The marble Medici lions by the stairs to the courtyard served as inspiration for Bernard Foucquet's bronze lions at the Lejonbacken (lion slope) on the northern side of the Royal Palace in Stockholm in 1700–1704.

See also 
 Villa Medicea di Cafaggiolo
 Villa Medici at Careggi
 Villa Medici in Fiesole
 Villa Medicea di Pratolino

Notes

References 
 
 Morel, Ph., Le Parnasse astrologique. Les décors peints pour le cardinal Ferdinand de Médicis. Étude iconologique (Paris, De Boccard, 1991) (La villa Médicis, 3).
 Hochmann, Michel, Villa Medici, il sogno di un Cardinale – Collezioni e artisti di Ferdinando de’ Medici (Roma, De Luca, 1999).

External links 
 
 
 

Houses completed in 1544
Medici
Renaissance architecture in Rome
Mannerist architecture in Italy
Medici villas
Rome R. IV Campo Marzio
1544 establishments in the Papal States
Medici residences